Tadej Rems (born 31 July 1993) is a Slovenian football defender who plays for NK Dob.

References

External links
PrvaLiga profile 

1993 births
Living people
Footballers from Ljubljana
Slovenian footballers
Association football defenders
NK Domžale players
NK Radomlje players
ND Ilirija 1911 players
NK Dob players
Slovenian PrvaLiga players
Slovenian Second League players
Slovenia youth international footballers